() is the lowest staff officer rank in the German Army, German Air Force. The rank is rated OF-3 in NATO. The rank insignia is a silver oakleaf cluster with a silver pip (star).

History

The rank in German-speaking armed forces dates back to the Middle Ages.

World War II

During World War II, the SS equivalent was Sturmbannführer.

Current rules

In the German Army and the Joint Support Service, the waiting period between meeting the requirements for promotion and actual promotion to the rank of  averages 15 months due to budget problems (as of July 2010).

See also
 Ranks of the German Bundeswehr 
 Rank insignia of the German Bundeswehr
 Comparative military ranks of World War I
 Comparative military ranks of World War II

References

de:Major
Military ranks of Germany